Espoo Metro Areena (known from 1999 to January 2009 as LänsiAuto Areena, and from 2009 to October 2015 as Barona Areena) is an arena in the Tapiola District of Espoo, Finland. The arena is sponsored by Hesburger, Finland's largest fast food hamburger chain and is part of the Tapiolan Urheilupuisto (Tapiola Sports Park). It was inaugurated in 1999 and holds 6,982 people for ice-hockey games or 8,582 for concerts.

Events
Espoo Metro Areena has been primarily used for ice hockey and it was the home arena of the Espoo Blues of the Liiga from 1999 to 2016 and of Espoo United of the Mestis from 2016 until the franchise was dissolved in 2018.

In late October and early November 2022, it served as the leading venue for the 2022 World Ringette Championships. In January 2023 it was the venue for 2023 European Figure Skating Championships.

The arena hosted Uuden Musiikin Kilpailu, Finland's national selection process for the Eurovision Song Contest, in 2013, 2014, 2017 and 2018.

See also
 List of indoor arenas in Finland
 List of indoor arenas in Nordic countries

References

External links

  

Indoor arenas in Finland
Indoor ice hockey venues in Finland
Buildings and structures in Espoo
Sports venues completed in 1999
1999 establishments in Finland
Kiekko-Espoo